The compositions of American composer Charles Ives (1874–1954) are mostly modern classical music. Ives was prolific, revised works multiple times, and left ambiguous fragments with no title or notes. A chronology of works is especially difficult because of missing and sometimes misleading dates; as Elliott Carter put it in 1939: "[Ives] has rewritten his works so many times, adding dissonances and polyrhythms, that it is impossible to tell just at what date the works assumed the surprising form we know now."

This list follows James B. Sinclair's A Descriptive Catalogue of the Music of Charles Ives. It does not include fragments or projected works.

Orchestra

Symphonies 
 Symphony No. 1 in D minor (1898–1902)
 Symphony No. 2 (1897–1902, revised 1910)
 Symphony No. 3: The Camp Meeting (1901–1904, rev. 1911)
 Symphony No. 4 (1916)
 A Symphony: New England Holidays (1919)
 Universe Symphony (1928, unfinished)

Sets 
For orchestra
 Orchestral Set No. 1: Three Places in New England (1912–16, revised 1929)
 Orchestral Set No. 2 (1909–19)
 Orchestral Set No. 3 (fragments only; 1919–26; notes added after 1934)
For chamber orchestra
 Set No. 1 (1912); includes Calcium Light Night
 Set No. 2 (1912); includes Gyp the Blood, or Hearst? Which Is Worst?
 Set No. 3 (At Sea – Luck and Work – Premonitions, 1917)
 Set No. 4, Three Poets and Human Nature – projected only
 Set No. 5, The Other Side of Pioneering, or Side Lights on American Enterprise – projected only
 Set No. 6, From the Side Hill – projected only
 Set No. 7, Water Colors – projected or lost
 Set No. 8, Songs Without Voices – projected only
 Set No. 9 of Three Pieces (The Last Reader – The See'r – The Unanswered Question, 1934)
 Set No. 10 of Three Pieces (Like a Sick Eagle – Luck and Work – The Indians, 1934)
 Set for Theatre Orchestra (1915)

Overtures 
 Alcott Overture (1904, inc., but re-used for the third movement of Piano Sonata No.2)
 Emerson Overture for Piano and Orchestra or Emerson Concerto (1911–12, incomplete, but re-used for the first movement of Piano Sonata No.2)
 Matthew Arnold Overture (1912, inc.)
 Overture and March: 1776 (1904, rev. 1910; re-used in "Putnam's Camp" from Three Places in New England and Holidays Symphony)
 Overture in G Minor (1899, inc.)
 Overture: Nationals (1915, inc. sketches; adapted from Overture and March: 1776)
 Robert Browning Overture (1914, rev. 1942)

Marches 
 Holiday Quickstep (1887)
 Country Band March ((Sketched 1903), rev. 1912, inc. – used in "Putnam's Camp")
 March No. 2, with Son of a Gambolier (1895?)
 March No. 3 in F and C (1893?, inc.)
 March No. 3, with My Old Kentucky Home (1895?)
 March No. 4 in F and C (1894?, inc.)
 The Circus Band (1898)

Others 
 Hymn: Largo cantabile, from A Set of Three Short Pieces (1904)
 Central Park in the Dark (1906, rev. 1936)
 Chromâtimelôdtune (1923?)
 Quarter-Tone Chorale for Strings (1914, lost)
 The General Slocum (1910?, inc.)
 The Gong on the Hook and Ladder or Firemen's Parade on Main Street (1911)
 Piece for Small Orchestra and Organ (1905?, mostly lost)
 The Pond (1906, rev. 1913)
 Postlude in F (1899?)
 Three Ragtime Dances (1911, mostly lost)
 Four Ragtime Dances (?)
 Nine Ragtime Pieces (1902?, mostly lost)
 The Rainbow (1914)
 Skit for Danbury Fair (1909, inc.)
 Take-Off No. 7: Mike Donlin–Johnny Evers (1907, inc.)
 Take-Off No. 8: Willy Keeler at Bat (1907, inc.)
 Tone Roads et al. (1915?)
 Tone Roads No. 1 (1911)
 Tone Roads No. 2 (1915?, lost)
 Tone Roads No. 3 (1915)
 The Unanswered Question (1908, rev. 1935)
 Yale–Princeton Football Game (1899, inc.)

Band 
 Fantasia on Jerusalem the Golden (1888)
 March in F and C, with Omega Lambda Chi (1896)
 March Intercollegiate, with Annie Lisle (1892)
 Runaway Horse on Main Street (1908, inc.)
 Schoolboy March in D and F, Op. 1 (1886, mostly lost)

Chamber/Instrumental 
String quartet
 String Quartet No. 1: From the Salvation Army (1900)
 String Quartet No. 2 (1913)
Violin sonata
 Pre-First Sonata for Violin and Piano (1913)
 Violin Sonata No. 1 (1917?)
 Violin Sonata No. 2 (1917?)
 Violin Sonata No. 3 (1914?)
 Violin Sonata No. 4: Children's Day at the Camp Meeting (1916)
Other
 Decoration Day (1919)
 From the Steeples and the Mountains (1901)
 Fugue in B-flat (1895?, inc.)
 Fugue in D (1895?, mostly lost)
 Fugue in Four Greek Modes (1897, inc.)
 Fugue in Four Keys on The Shining Shore (1903?, inc.)
 Hymn: Largo cantabile, from A Set of Three Short Pieces (1904)
 Hallowe'en (1914)
 In Re Con Moto et al. (1916), for violin, viola, bass, and piano, world premiere given in February 1966 at Carnegie Hall
 Largo for Violin and Piano (1901)
 Largo for Violin, Clarinet, and Piano (1934? arrangement of Largo for violin and piano)
 Largo Risoluto No. 1 (1909)
 Largo Risoluto No. 2 (1910)
 An Old Song Deranged (1903)
 Piece in G for String Quartet (1891?)
 Polonaise (1887, inc.)
 Practice for String Quartet in Holding Your Own! (1903)
 Prelude on Eventide (1908)
 Scherzo: All the Way Around and Back (1908)
 Scherzo: Over the Pavements (1910)
 Scherzo for String Quartet (1904)
 A Set of Three Short Pieces (1935?)
 Take-Off No. 3: Rube Trying to Walk 2 to 3!! (1909)
 Trio for Violin, Violoncello, and Piano (1907, rev. 1915)

Keyboard

Works for piano
Sonatas
 Three Page Sonata (1905)
 Piano Sonata No. 1 (1909)
 Piano Sonata No. 2 (Concord) (1915)

Studies
 27 Studies for piano, 8 lost
 Study No. 1: Allegro (incomplete)
 Study No. 2: Andante moderato–Allegro molto (Varied Air and Variations)
 Study No. 3: (lost)
 Study No. 4: Allegro moderato (incomplete)
 Study No. 5: Moderato con anima
 Study No. 6: Andante (1907–1909)
 Study No. 7: Andante cantabile (1907)
 Study No. 8: Trio (Allegro moderato–Presto) (1907)
 Study No. 9: The Anti-Abolitionist Riots in the 1830s and 1840s
 Study No. 10 (mostly lost)
 Study No. 11: Andante (incomplete)
 Study No. 12: (lost)
 Study No. 13: (lost)
 Study No. 14: (lost)
 Study No. 15: Allegro moderato (incomplete) (1907–1909; 1920s)
 Study No. 16: Andante cantabile (incomplete) (1907–1909; 1920s)
 Study No. 17: (lost)
 Study No. 18: Sunrise Cadenza (Adagio) (incomplete)
 Study No. 19 (incomplete) (1907–1909; 1920s)
 Study No. 20: March (Slow allegro or Fast andante) (1910, 1920s)
 Study No. 21: Some Southpaw Pitching (1918–19)
 Study No. 22: Andante maestoso–Allegro vivace (1909)
 Study No. 23: Allegro (1912–1914; 1920s)
 Study No. 24: (lost)
 Study No. 25: (lost)
 Study No. 26: (lost)
 Study No. 27: Chromâtimelôdtune (incomplete)

Marches
 March No. 1 for Piano, with "Year of Jubilee" (c. 1894–95)
 March No. 2 for Piano, with "Son of a Gambolier" [inc.] (1895)
 March No. 3 for Piano, with "Omega Lambda Chi" (c. 1895–96)
 March No. 5 for Piano, with "Annie Lisle" (c. 1895)
 March No. 6 for Piano, with "Here's to Good Old Yale" (c. 1895–96)
 March in G and C for Piano, with "See the Conquering Hero Comes" (1896–7)
 March for Piano: The Circus Band (c. 1898–99)

Other works
 The Celestial Railroad (c. 1922–25)
 Three Improvisations (1938)
 Invention in D (c. 1898)
 Minuetto, Op. 4 (1886)
 New Year's Dance (1887)
 Piece in G Minor 
 Set of Five Take-Offs (c. 1909)
 Four Transcriptions from "Emerson" (c. 1923–27)
 Varied Air and Variations (1920–22)
 Waltz–Rondo (1911)

Two pianos
 Burlesque Storm
 Drum Corps or Scuffle [mostly lost]
 Three Quarter-Tone Pieces
 Ragtime Dances for Two Pianos

Works for organ
 Adagio in F
 "Adeste Fideles" in an Organ Prelude (c. 1903)
 Burlesque Postlude in B
 Burlesque Postlude in C
 Canzonetta in F (c. 1893–94)
 Fugue in C Minor (c. 1898)
 Fugue in E (c. 1898)
 Interludes for Hymns (1898–1901)
 Melody in E
 Postlude for Thanksgiving Service [mostly lost]
 Variations on "America", for organ (1891) (arranged for orchestra by William Schuman and also arranged for piano solo by Lowell Liebermann)
Voluntary in C Minor
 Voluntary in F

Vocal

Songs 
{| class="wikitable sortable"
|-
! Title
! (Incipit)
! in 114 Songs
! Collections
! Words
| Comments
|-
| Abide with me
|-
| Aeschylus and Sophocles
|
|
|19 Songs
|
|-
| Afterglow
|At the quite close
|39
|
|James Fenimore Cooper Jr.
|-
| Allegro
|By morning's brightest beam
|95
|
|H. or Ch. Ives
|-
| The All-Enduring
|-
| Amphion (from "Amphion")
|The mountain stirred
|106
|
|Tennyson
|-
| Ann Street
|Quaint name…
|25
|
|Maurice Morris
|-
| At Parting
|-
| At Sea
|Some things are undivined
|4
|
|R. U. Johnson
|
|-
| At the River
|Shall we gather
|
|
|Robert Lowry
|arr. from Violin Sonata 4
|-
| Atalanta
|-
| August
|For August, be your dwelling
|35
|
|D. G. Rossetti, after San Geminiano
|-
| Autumn [II]
|Earth rests
|60
|
|H. or Ch. Ives
|-
| Because of You
|-
| Because Thou Art
|-
| Berceuse
|O're the mountain
|93
|
|H. or Ch. Ives
|-
| The Cage
|A leopard went around
|64
|
|H. or Ch. Ives
|-
| The Camp Meeting
|Across the summer meadows
|47
|
|Charlotte Elliot
|from Symphony No. 3
|-
| Canon [I]
|Oh, the days are gone
|111
|19 Songs
|Moore
|-
| Canon [II] 
|-
| Chanson de Florian
|Ah! s'il est dans votre village
|78
|
|Claris de Florian
|-
| Charlie Rutlage
|Another good cowpuncher
|10
|
|Cowboy Songs
|-
| The Children's Hour, from
|Between the dark
|74
|
|Longfellow
|-
| A Christmas Carol
|Little town of Bethlehem
|100
|19 Songs
|"traditional"
|-
| The Circus Band
|All summer long
|56
|
|H. or Ch. Ives
|-
| The Collection
|Now help us, Lord
|38
|
|"stanzas from old hymns"
|-
| The Coming of the Day
|-
| Country Celestial
|-
| Cradle Song
|Hush thee
|33
|19 Songs
|A. L. Ives
|-
| December
|Last, for December
|37
|
|D. G. Rossetti, after San Geminiano
|-
| Disclosure
|Thoughts, which deeply rest
|7
|
|Ch. or H. Ives
|-
| Down East
|Songs! Visions of my home
|55
|
|Ives
|-
| Dream Sweetly
|-
| Dreams
|When twilight comes
|85
|
|Porteous
|German version?
|-
| Du alte Mutter / My dear old mother
|-
| Du bist wie eine Blume
|
|
|
|Heinrich Heine
|-
| Ein Ton / I hear a tone
|-
| Elégie
|O doux printemps
|77
|
|Gallet
|-
| The Ending Year
|-
| Evening
|Now came still Evening
|2
|
|Milton
|-
| Evidence
|There comes o're the valley
|58
|
|Ives
|-
| Far from my heav'nly home
|-
| Far in the wood
|-
| A Farewell to Land
|
|
|19 Songs
|-
| La Fède
|La fede mai non debe
|34
|19 Songs
|Ariosto
|-
| Feldeinsamkeit / In Summer Fields
|Ich ruhe still / Quite still I lie
|82
|19 Songs
|Allmers (tr. Chapman)
|-
| Flag Song
|-
| Forward into Light
|
|99
|
|Alford after St Bernard
|from "The Celestial Country"
|-
| Friendship
|-
| Frühlingslied
|-
| General William Booth Enters into Heaven
|Booth led boldly
|
|19 Songs
|Vachel Lindsay
|-
| God Bless and Keep Thee
|-
| Grace
|-
| Grantchester
|would I were in Grantchester
|17
|
|Rupert Brooke
|-
| The Greatest Man
|My teacher said
|19
|
|Anne Timoney Collins
|-
| Gruss
|-
| Harpalus (An  Ancient Pastoral)
|Oh, Harpalus!
|73
|
|Thomas Percy
|-
| He Is There!
|Fifteen years ago
|50
|
|Ives
|also a WW2 sequel
|-
| Her Eyes
|-
| Her gown was of vermilion silk
|-
| His Exaltation
|For the grandeur
|46
|
|Robert Robinson
|from Violin Sonata No. 2
|-
| The Housatonic at Stockbridge
|Contented river!
|15
|
|R. U. Johnson
|-
| Hymn
|Thou hidden love
|20
|
|James George Walton after Tersteegen
|quoted by O. W. Holmes
|-
| Hymn of Trust
|-
| I knew and loved a maid
|-
| I travelled among unknown men
|I travelled among unknown men
|75
|
|Wordsworth
|-
| Ich grolle nicht / I'll not complain
|
|83
|
|Heine
|w/o English in 114
|-
| Ilmenau / Over all the treetops
|Über allen Gipfeln/Over all the hilltops
|68
|
|Goethe (tr. Harmony Twitchell Ives)
|-
| Immortality
|Who dares to say
|5
|
|
|-
| In a mountain spring
|-
| In April-tide
|-
| In Autumn
|-
| In Flanders Fields
|In Flanders Fields
|49
|
|McCrae
|-
| In My Beloved's Eyes
|-
| In the Alley
|On my way to work
|53
|
|Ives
|-
| from the "Incantation"
|When the moon
|18
|
|Byron
|-
| Incomplete song [I]
|-
| Incomplete song [II]
|-
| The Indians
|Alas! for them
|14
|
|Charles Sprague
|-
| The Innate
|Voices live in every finite being
|40
|19 Songs
|Ives
|-
| Kären
|Do'st remember child!
|91
|
|unknown
|-
| The Last Reader
|I sometimes sit
|3
|
|O. W. Holmes
|-
| The Light That Is Felt
|A tender child
|66
|
|Whittier
|-
| Like a Sick Eagle
|The spirit is too weak
|26
|
|Keats
|-
| Lincoln, the Great Commoner
|And so he came
|11
|
|Edwin Markham
|-
| Longing
|-
| Die Lotosblume / The Lotus Flower
|Die Lotosblume ängstigt
|
|
|Heine
|see The South wind
|-
| The Love Song of Har Dyal
|-
| Luck and Work
|While one will search
|21
|
|R. U. Johnson
|-
| Majority
|The Masses
|1
|19 Songs
|Ch. Ives
|-
| Maple Leaves
|October turned my maple's leaves
|23
|
|Th. B. Aldrich
|-
| Marie
|Marie, I see thee
|92
|
|Gottschall
|-
| Memories: a. Very Pleasant; b. Rather Sad
|We're sitting in the opera house/ From the street a strain
|102
|-
| Minnelied
|-
| Mirage
|The hope I dreamed of
|70
|
|Ives
|-
| Mists [I]
|Low lie the mists
|57
|
|Ives
|-
| Mists [II]
|-
| My Lou Jennine
|-
| My Native Land [I]
|My Native Land now meets my eye
|101
|
|Traditional
|-
| My Native Land [II]
|
|
|
|Farewell to land?
|-
| My Task
|-
| Nature's Way
|When the distant evening
|61
|
|Ives
|-
| Naught that country needeth
|
|98
|Alford after St Bernard
|from "The Celestial Country"
|-
| The New River
|Down the river
|6
|
|Ch. or H. Ives
|-
| Night of Frost in May (from)
|There was the lyre of earth
|84
|Meredith
|-
| A Night Song
|The young May moon
|88
|
|Moore
|-
| A Night Thought
|How oft a cloud
|107
|
|Moore
|-
| No More
|-
| Nov. 2, 1920 (An Election)
|It strikes me that
|22
|19 Songs (An Election)
|Ch. Ives?
|-
| An Old Flame
|When dreams enfold me
|87
|
|Ives
|-
| Old Home Day
|Go my songs!
|52
|
|Ives
|-
| The Old Mother/ Du alte Mutter
|Du alte Mutter/My dear old mother
|81
|
|Cordier, after Vinje
|set by Grieg Du gamle Mor!"
|-
| Omens and Oracles
|Phantoms of the future
|86
|
|'unknown' [ Robert Bulwer-Lytton ]
|-
| On Judges' Walk
|-
| On the Antipodes
|
|
|19 Songs
|
|2 pianos & organ pedal
|-
| On the Counter
|Tunes we heard
|28
|
|Ch. Ives?
|-
| "1, 2, 3"
|-
| The One Way
|-
| The Only Son
|-
| Paracelsus (from)
|For God is glorified
|30
|19 Songs
|Browning
|from latter part of sc. v
|-
| Peaks
|-
| A Perfect Day
|-
| Pictures
|-
| Premonitions
|There's a shadow
|24
|
|R. U. Johnson
|-
| Qu'il m'irait bien
|Qu'il m'irait bien
|76
|
|Moreau Delano
|-
| The Rainbow (So May It Be!)
|My heart leaps up
|8
|
|Wordsworth
|-
| Religion
|There is no unbelief.
|16
|
|James T. Bixby
|-
| Remembrance
|The sound of a distant horn
|12
|
|Ch. Ives
|untitled in 114; "The Pond" in orchestral version
|-
| Requiem
|
|19 Songs
|-
| Resolution
|Walking stronger
|13
|19 Songs
|Ch. or H. Ives
|-
| Rock of Ages
|-
| Romanzo (di Central Park)
|Grove, Rove, Night, Delight
|96
|
|parody, attr. Leigh Hunt
|-
| Rosamunde (De la drama:)
|J'attends, helas!
|79
|
|Bélanger
|-
| Rosenzweige
|-
| Rough Wind
|Rough wind that moanest loud
|69
|
|Shelley
|-
| Runaway Horse on Main Street
|-
| A Scotch Lullaby
|-
| A Sea Dirge
|-
| The Sea of Sleep
|-
| The See'r
|An old man
|29
|
|Ch.Ives?
|-
| Sehnsucht
|-
| September
|And in September
|36
|
|D. G. Rossetti, after San Geminiano
|-
| Serenity
|O Sabbath rest of [sic]
|42
|
|Whittier
|-
| The Side Show
|Is that Mister Riley
|32
|
|Ives
|-
| Slow March (Inscribed to the Children's Faithful Friend)
|One evening just at sunset
|114
|
|H. or Ch. Ives
|after the dead march in Saul|-
| Slugging a Vampire
|
|
|19 Songs
|Ives
|see Tarrant Moss, replaced for copyright reasons
|-
| Smoke
|-
| Soliloquy
|-
| A Son of a Gambolier
|Come join my humble ditty
|54
|
|Ives?
|-
| Song
|-
| A Song—For Anything: 
|a. When the waves softly sigh; b. Yale, Farewell!; c. Hear My Prayer, O Lord
|89
|
|-
| Song for Harvest Season
|-
| The Song of the Dead [lost]
|-
| Song without words [I]
|-
| Song without words [II]
|-
| Song without words [III]
|-
| Songs my Mother Taught Me
|
|108
|
|Heyduk 'tr. adapted'
|-
| The South Wind / Die Lotosblume
|When gently blows
|97
|
|Ives, substituting Heine
|-
| Spring Song
|Across the hill of late
|65
|
|Ives
|-
| The Sun shines hot
|-
| Sunrise
|-
| Swimmers (from the)
|Then the swift plunge
|27
|
|Louis Untermeyer
|-
| Tarrant Moss
|I closed and drew
|72
|
|Kipling
|see Sluggin a Vampire|-
| Thee I Love
|-
| There is a certain garden
|-
| There is a lane
|There is a lane
|71
|
|Ives
|-
| 
| There's a time in many a life
|
|
| C.Ives
| revised version of He is there! in 1917 
|-
| The Things Our Fathers Loved
|I think there must
|43
|
|Ives
|-
| Thoreau
|He grew in those seasons
|48
|
|
|from Piano Sonata 2
|-
| Those Evening Bells
|Those Evening Bells!
|63
|
|Moore
|-
| Through Night and Day
|-
| To Edith
|So like a flower
|112
|
|Ives
|new words?
|-
| Tolerance
|How can I turn
|59
|
|Pres. Hadley (actually Kipling)
|-
| Tom Sails Away
|Scenes from my childhood
|51
|19 Songs
|Ives
|-
| Two Little Flowers
|On sunny days in our backyard
|104
|19 Songs
|H. or Ch. Ives
|-
| Two Slants (Christian and Pagan): a. Duty; b. Vita
|
|9 a&b
|-
| Vote for Names! Names! Names!
|-
| The Waiting Soul
|Breathe from the gentle South
|62
|
|Cowper [??]
|-
| Walking
|A big October morning
|67
|
|Ives
|-
| Walt Whitman
|Who goes there?
|31
|
|Walt Whitman
|from LoG stanza 20
|-
| Waltz
|Round and round
|109
|
|Ives
|-
| Watchman! 
|Watchman, tell us
|44
|
|John Bowring
|from Violin Sonata 2
|-
| Watchman! [II]
|-
| Weil' auf mir / Eyes so dark
|Weil auf mir/Eyes so dark
|80
|
|Lenau/Westbrook
|-
| West London
|Crouch'd on the pavement
|105
|
|Matthew Arnold
|-
| When stars are in the quiet skies
|When stars are in the quiet skies
|113
|
|Bulwer-Lytton
|-
| Where the eagle cannot see
|
|94
|
|Monica Peveril Turnbull
|-
| The White Gulls (from the Russian)
|The White Gulls dip and wheel
|103
|
|Maurice Morris
|-
| Who knows the light
|-
| Widmung
|-
| Wie Melodien zieht es mir
|-
| Wiegenlied
|-
| William Will
|-
| The World's Highway
|For long I wander'd happily
|90
|
|H. or Ch. Ives
|-
| The World's Wanderers
|Tell me, star
|110
|
|Shelley
|-
| Yellow Leaves
|}

Choral works

Multi-movement sacred works
 The Celestial Country (1898–1902)
 Communion Service (c. 1894)
 Three Harvest Home Chorales (c. 1902, c. 1912–15)PsalmsPsalm 14 (1902, 1912–13)
Psalm 24 (1901, 1912–13)
Psalm 25 (1901, 1912–13)
Psalm 42 (1891–92)
Psalm 54 (1902)
Psalm 67 (1898–99)
Psalm 90 (1923–24)
Psalm 100 (1902)
Psalm 135 (1902, 1912–13)
Psalm 150 (1898–99)Other sacred works All-Forgiving, look on me 
 Anthem: With Hearts Rejoicing Ever 
 Be Thou, O God, Exalted High 
 Benedictus in E 
 Benedictus in G
 Bread of the World 
 Nine Canticle Phrases
 Chant, Op. 2, No. 2
 Crossing the Bar
 Easter Anthem
 Easter Carol
 Gloria in excelsis
 Hymn, Op. 2, No. 1
 I Come to Thee
 I Think of Thee, My God
 Kyrie 
 Life of the World 
 The Light That Is Felt
 Lord God, Thy Sea Is Mighty
 O God, My Heart Is Fixed
 Processsional: Let There Be Light
 Serenity [mostly lost]
 Turn Ye, Turn YeSecular chorus with instrumental ensemble December
 An Election
 General William Booth Enters into Heaven
 He Is There!
 Johnny Poe
 Lincoln, the Great Commoner
 The Masses (Majority)
 The New River
 Sneak Thief
 They Are There! (A War Song March)
 Two Slants (Christian and Pagan)
 Walt WhitmanPartsongs'''
 Age of Gold
 The Bells of Yale
 The Boys in Blue
 For You and Me!
 My Sweet Jeanette
 O Maiden Fair
 Partsong in A
 Partsong in B
 Partsong in E
 Serenade
 A Song of Mory's
 The Year's at the Spring

 Ballets to the music of Charles Ives 
 Ives, Songs Ivesiana The Unanswered Question''

References

External links
 

 
Ives